Miaenia mariana is a species of beetle in the family Cerambycidae. It was described by Gressitt in 1956.

References

Miaenia
Beetles described in 1956